The Voord are a fictional extraterrestrial race of mutants portrayed in the British science fiction television programme Doctor Who. Both "Voord" and "Voords" have been used as the plural form.  The Voord were conceived by science-fiction writer Terry Nation and first appeared in the 1964 Doctor Who serial The Keys of Marinus.  They later appeared in Doctor Who stories in other formats.  In one of those stories, written by Grant Morrison, the Voord are revealed to have evolved into the iconic Doctor Who villains the Cybermen.

The Keys of Marinus
The Voord were conceived as the villains for the season 1 Doctor Who serial The Keys of Marinus by writer Terry Nation, who previously conceived of the Daleks for an earlier season 1 Doctor Who story.  As with the Daleks, Nation's script left the description of the Voord vague, and the design was developed by costume designer Daphne Dare.  Freelance contractors Dave and John Lovell created the three heads and three pairs of black gloves that were used as part of the Voord costumes for less than 70 pounds.  The Voord were portrayed by actors Martin Cort, Peter Stenson and Gordon Wales and their leader Yartek by Stephen Dartnell.

Author Dave Thompson described the Voord as "black amphibious humanoids."  Authors Tat Woods and Lawrence Miles describe them as "web-footed human beings in black frogman outfits." Authors David J. Howe, Mark Stammers and Stephen James Walker describe them as "rubber suited assailants."  Howe and Walker describe the Voords' wetsuit costumes as "clichéd but surprisingly effective."  They describe the helmets as being "cleverly designed," containing different shaped antennae for all the Voord except Yartek.  Woods and Miles describe the "wedge-shaped helmets" with antennae as suggesting an "evil Teletubby."  Woods and Miles also take certain clues from the story to suggest that the Voord may actually look like humans under their outfits.  Their wet suits are acid-proof but can tear.  The Voord weapons include a dagger and a ray gun.  Woods and Miles compare their submarine to a squeegee bottle.

Woods and Miles note that the Voord are very clumsy.  They state that the commando raid the Voord enact in "suggests they were trained by Norman Wisdom," further stating that "if there's a hidden death trap to stumble into, then they'll find it, usually in the most slapstick way imaginable."  One trips on his own flippers and another (portrayed by the same actor, Peter Stenson) stabs himself in the back.

The Voord were regarded as the main villains of The Keys of Marinus despite the fact that they only appeared in the first and last episodes of this six part story.  In the plot, the Voord, including their leader Yartek, have developed resistance to the Conscience of Marinus, which eliminates fear and aggression from the inhabitants of Marinus, and want to use the device for their own evil purposes.  They are defeated when the Doctor's companion Ian Chesterton tricks them into destroying the machine.  The Voord are killed in the resulting explosion, although it is left ambiguous as to whether Yartek escapes the explosion.

Later appearances
The Voord appeared in the first edition of Doctor Who Annual in September 1965.  A Voord was shown on the cover of the book along with a representative three other Doctor Who races, a Sensorite, a Zarbi and a Menoptra.  The Voord appeared in the magazine in a story called "The Fishmen of Kandalinga."  The story told of Voord who escaped from the planet Marinus after their defeat by the First Doctor, who then attempted to enslave a mutant race of fish people on their new planet but were stopped by the First Doctor and his companions.

Also in 1965, the Voord appeared in a series of trading cards put out by Cadet Sweets with their candy cigarettes.  The cards told a story in which the Voord were defeated by the Daleks.
 
In 1980 they appeared in the novelization of The Keys of Marinus, Doctor Who and the Keys of Marinus, written by Philip Hinchcliffe and published by Target Books.

The Voord later appeared in a comic strip story "The World Shapers" written by Grant Morrison within Doctor Who Magazine issues 127 through 129.  In this story, involving the Sixth Doctor and Peri Brown, the Voord are revealed to be evolving into the Cybermen.  The Doctor discovers that the Time Lords could prevent this from occurring but they refuse to, despite the Doctor's pleas.

In the 1999 novel Interference – Book Two, Kode finds a book in the TARDIS library noting that the Voord's fetishistic apparel and receiver aerials are similar to those of the Remote, another media-dependent culture. It speculates that Marinus is an early experiment by the Remote's creators, Faction Paradox, and that the Voord might be considered the Remote's direct ancestors.

In September 2014 the Voord appeared in a Big Finish Productions story entitled Domain of the Voord.  The cast includes William Russell and Carole Ann Ford, as the Doctor's companions Ian Chesterton and Susan Foreman respectively, reprising the roles they played in The Keys of Marinus.  The script is by Andrew Smith, who previously wrote the Fourth Doctor story Full Circle in 1980.

The Voord appear in the Titan Comics multi-Doctor event "Four Doctors", opposite the Twelfth, Eleventh and Tenth Doctors. It is revealed that they evolved during the Time War and fought alongside the War Doctor against the Daleks. After the war they attempted to retain their new advanced capabilities, which include a hive consciousness and the ability to absorb anyone into the Voord collective, they removed themselves and Marinus into a pocket dimension, erasing all memory of Marinus from the universe (including the Doctor). Allying with an alternate reality version of the Twelfth Doctor, who became villainous after being betrayed by Clara Oswald (in "Dark Water"), the Voord were eventually defeated by the earlier Twelfth Doctor, along with the Tenth and Eleventh Doctors.

Impact
The Voord were the first Doctor Who alien race to be marketed as the successor to Terry Nation's previous alien creation, the Daleks.  Despite attempts to merchandise the Voord, they never achieved the popularity of the Daleks.  Author Peter Haining notes that they did achieve "some fame and recognition through merchandising spin-offs. Amicus Productions, which made two Dalek movies, acquired the movie rights to The Keys of Marinus but the movie was never made.  Doctor Who author Dave Thompson, however, regards them as "one of the show's most sadly underused alien menaces."  He also describes them as "one of the show's least loved (but actually most enjoyable) alien menaces."  in 1979 Stephen Poole wrote that limiting the Voord to just the first and last episodes of The Keys of Marinus was "a great waste of potential."  Voord actor Peter Stenson later wrote about his experience portraying a Voord for a leather fetish magazine.

See also
 List of Doctor Who universe creatures and aliens

References

External links
 Voord at Tardis Data Core

Doctor Who races
Fictional amphibians
Television characters introduced in 1964
Fictional cyborgs
Fictional warrior races